Raithu Bidda (English: Farmer of Common Origins) (Telugu: రైతు బిడ్డ, lit. Farmer-Son of the Soil) is a 1939 Telugu social problem film directed by Gudavalli Ramabrahmam. It is a social reformist film during the period of British India, at the time of battle against Zamindari system. The film was banned by the British Administration in the region. Ironically it was produced by one of the Zamindars of the time, Challapalli Maharaja. The film had a public re-release in 1948.

The Cast

Soundtrack
 "Nidra Melukora Tammuda Gaadha Nidra Melukora Tammuda" - (Snger: P. Suri Babu)
 "Mangalamamma Maa Poojalu Gaikonumamma" - Group song
 "Raitu Paina Anuragamu Choopani" - (Singer: P. Suribabu)
 "Vayinchuma Murali Vayinchu Krishna"
 "Kanna Biddakai Kalavara Paduchunu Kanneeru Karchunu" - (Singer: P. Suribabu)
 "Ravoyi Vanamali Birabira Ravoyi" - (Singer: Tanguturi Suryakumari)
 "Sai Sai Idena Bharathi Nee Pere" - (Burrakatha by P. Suri Babu group)
 "Sukshetramulu Dayasoonulai Peedinchu" (Poem by P. Suri Babu)
 "Raithuke Otivvavalenanna Nee Kashta Sukhamula" - (Singers: P. Suri Babu and others)
 "Dasavatraramulu" - (Veedhi Natakam)

References

External links
 Raithu Bidda film at IMDb.

1939 films
1930s Telugu-language films
Indian black-and-white films
Indian drama films
1939 drama films